Moving or Movin' may refer to:

Moving of goods 
 Relocation (personal), the process of leaving one dwelling and settling in another
 Relocation of professional sports teams
 Relocation (computer science)
 Structure relocation

Music

Albums 
 Moving (Peter, Paul and Mary album), 1963
 Moving (The Raincoats album), 1983
 [[Movin' (Herman van Doorn album)|Movin''' (Herman van Doorn album)]], 2001
 [[Movin' (Jennifer Rush album)|Movin' (Jennifer Rush album)]], 1985

 Songs 
 "Moving" (Kate Bush song), 1978
 "Moving" (Supergrass song), 1999
 "Moving" (Travis song), 2013
 "Moving", by Suede from Suede, 1993
 "Moving", by Cathy Davey from Tales of Silversleeve, 2007
 "Movin (Brass Construction song), 1976
 "Movin (Mohombi song), 2014
 "Movin, by Skin from Fake Chemical State'', 2006

Other uses 
 Moving (1988 film), a comedy starring Richard Pryor
 Moving (1993 film), a Japanese film
 Moving (British TV series), a British sitcom starring Penelope Keith
Moving (South Korean TV series), an upcoming South Korean television series
 Movin' (brand), a brand name used for radio stations

See also 
 Moving company, a type of company that will relocate household or other goods.
 Relocation service, relating to employees and company departments
 Move (disambiguation)
 Movin' On (disambiguation)
 Moving In (disambiguation)
 Moving on Up (disambiguation)
 Relocation (disambiguation)